Andrew Robertson (born 1941) is a British actor. He appeared in more than forty films since 1962.

Selected filmography

External links
 

1941 births
Living people
British male television actors
British male film actors